Mary Poppins is a 1964 American musical fantasy film directed by Robert Stevenson and produced by Walt Disney, with songs written and composed by the Sherman Brothers. The screenplay is by Bill Walsh and Don DaGradi, based on P. L. Travers's book series Mary Poppins. The film, which combines live-action and animation, stars Julie Andrews in her feature film debut as Mary Poppins, who visits a dysfunctional family in London and employs her unique brand of lifestyle to improve the family's dynamic. Dick Van Dyke, David Tomlinson, and Glynis Johns are featured in supporting roles. The film was shot entirely at the Walt Disney Studios in Burbank, California, using painted London background scenes.

Mary Poppins was released on August 27, 1964, to critical acclaim and commercial success. It became the highest-grossing film of 1964 and, at the time of its release, was Disney's highest-grossing film ever. It received a total of 13 Academy Awards nominations, including Best Picture – a record for any film released by Walt Disney Studios – and won five: Best Actress for Andrews, Best Film Editing, Best Original Music Score, Best Visual Effects, and Best Original Song for "Chim Chim Cher-ee". Mary Poppins is considered Walt Disney's crowning live-action achievement and is the only one of his films which earned a Best Picture nomination during his lifetime. In 2013, the film was selected for preservation in the United States National Film Registry by the Library of Congress as being "culturally, historically, or aesthetically significant".

A biographical drama on the making of the film, Saving Mr. Banks, was released on October 20, 2013. A sequel, Mary Poppins Returns, was released on December 19, 2018.

Plot 

In Edwardian-era London, in the spring of 1910, George Banks returns home, at number 17 Cherry Tree Lane, to learn from his wife, Winifred, that the babysitter Katie Nanna has left their service after their children, Jane and Michael, had run away "for the fourth time this week" ("Life I Lead"). They are returned home shortly after by Constable Jones, who reveals the children were chasing after a lost kite. The children ask their father to help them build a better kite, but he dismisses them. Taking it upon himself to hire a new nanny, Mr. Banks advertises for a stern, no-nonsense nanny. In contrast, Jane and Michael present their own advertisement for a kinder, sweeter nanny ("Perfect Nanny"). Winifred, who strongly agrees with the children, tries to keep the peace. After ordering Jane and Michael to go to bed, Mr. Banks rips up the letter and throws the scraps in the fireplace, but a strong wind draws the fragments up through the chimney and into the air.

The next day, a number of elderly, sour-faced nannies wait outside the Banks' home for Ellen to show them all in, but a strong gust of wind blows them away. Jane and Michael then witness a young magical nanny descending from the sky using her umbrella. Presenting herself to Mr. Banks, Mary Poppins calmly produces the children's restored advertisement and agrees with its requests but promises the astonished banker that she will be firm with his children. As Mr. Banks puzzles over the advertisement's return, Mary Poppins hires herself, and she convinces him it was originally his idea. She meets the children and helps them magically tidy their nursery by snapping her fingers, before heading out for a walk in the park ("Spoonful of Sugar").

Outside, they meet Mary's old friend, Bert, a jack of all trades working as a street painter; Mary Poppins uses her magic to transport the group into one of his drawings. While the children ride on a carousel, Mary Poppins and Bert go on a leisurely stroll. Together, they sing ("Jolly Holiday"), and Bert flirts with Mary Poppins. After the duo meets up with the children, Mary Poppins enchants the carousel horses; Bert rescues a fox from a fox hunt; they take part in a horse race which Mary wins. Describing her victory, Mary Poppins uses a nonsense word ("Supercalifragilisticexpialidocious"). The outing is ended when a thunderstorm dissolves Bert's drawings, returning the group to London; upon their return home, Mary forces the children to take medicine to avoid getting sick and puts them into bed, when Jane and Michael refuse to go to sleep, she calmly sings to them to help them go to sleep quicker ("Stay Awake").

The next day, the three meet Bert's odd Uncle Albert, who has floated up in the air because of his uncontrollable laughter. They join him for a tea party on the ceiling with lots of jokes ("I Love to Laugh"). Afterward, Mr. Banks becomes annoyed by the household's cheery atmosphere and threatens to fire Mary Poppins, but she persuades him to take the children to his workplace the next day. That evening, Mary sings to the children a hymn-like lullaby about the woman who sits on the steps of the St. Paul's Cathedral selling bird food ("Feed The Birds"). The next day at the bank, the children meet the elderly Mr. Dawes., Senior. Mr. Dawes aggressively urges Michael to invest his tuppence in the bank, ultimately snatching the coin from Michael ("Fidelity Fiduciary Bank").  Michael demands his coin back; other customers overhear the conflict, and they all begin demanding their own money back, causing a bank run.

Jane and Michael flee the bank, getting lost in the East End of London until they again meet up with Bert, now working as a chimney sweep, who escorts them home ("Chim Chim Cheree"). The three and Mary Poppins venture onto the rooftops, where they have a song-and-dance number with other chimney sweeps, which spills out into the Banks' home ("Step in Time") after their neighbor Admiral Boom shoots cartoon fireworks at them, mistaking them for robbers and calling them "cheeky devils". Mr. and Mrs. Banks return home to find Bert's friends dancing in their home, and Mr. Banks sends them away. Mr. Banks then gets a phone call from the bank requesting a meeting with him about what the children did. The children overhear the phone call and realize that their father is in trouble. Bert tells Mr. Banks that he needs to spend more time with his children before they grow up ("A Man Has Dreams"). Michael gives his father the tuppence, hoping to make amends.

Mr. Banks walks through London to the bank, where he is given a humiliating cashiering and is dismissed. Looking to the tuppence for words, he blurts out "Supercalifragilisticexpialidocious", tells Uncle Albert's "Wooden leg named Smith" joke the children told, and happily heads home. Mr. Dawes mulls over the joke and, finally understanding it, floats up into the air, laughing.

The next day, the wind changes, meaning Mary Poppins must leave. A happier Mr. Banks is found at home, having fixed his children's kite, and takes the family out to fly it. In the park, the Banks family meets Mr. Dawes' son, Mr. Dawes Jr., who reveals his father died laughing from the joke ("Let's Go Fly a Kite"). Mr. Dawes Jr. says he had never seen his father happier in his life and re-employs Mr. Banks as a junior partner. With her work done, Mary Poppins ends the movie by flying away, with Bert telling her from afar not to stay away too long.

Cast

Live-action cast

 Julie Andrews as Mary Poppins, a magical and loving woman who descends from the clouds in response to the Banks children's advertisement for a nanny. She is firm in her use of authority but gentle and kind as well, a major departure from the original books, in which the character was more stern and pompous.
 Dick Van Dyke as Bert, a cockney jack-of-all-trades and Mary Poppins' closest friend, who is completely accustomed to her magic. Their playful interactions imply that they have known each other for a long time and that this kind of story has repeated itself many times. Bert has at least four jobs throughout the film: a one-man band, a pavement chalk artist, a chimney sweep, and a kite seller.
 Van Dyke also portrays Mr. Dawes Sr., the old director of the bank where Mr. Banks works. During the film's end titles, "Navckid Keyd", an anagram of Dick Van Dyke, is first credited as playing the role before the letters unscramble to reveal Van Dyke's name.
 David Tomlinson as George Banks, Mary Poppins' employer and father of Jane and Michael. He works at the Dawes Tomes Mousley Grubbs Fidelity Fiduciary Bank in London. He is a driven and disciplined man.
 Glynis Johns as Winifred Banks, the easily distracted wife of George Banks and the mother of Jane and Michael. She is depicted as a member of Emmeline Pankhurst's "Votes for Women" suffrage movement. Mrs. Banks was originally named Cynthia, but this was changed to the more English-sounding Winifred per Travers.
 Hermione Baddeley as Ellen, the maid of the Banks residence.
 Karen Dotrice as Jane Banks, daughter of Mr and Mrs Banks and Michael's older sister.
 Matthew Garber as Michael Banks, son of Mr and Mrs Banks and Jane's younger brother.
 Elsa Lanchester as Katie Nanna, the disgruntled nanny who quits the Banks family.
 Arthur Treacher as Constable Jones, a police officer.
 Reginald Owen as Admiral Boom, the Banks' eccentric neighbor and a naval officer. He has his first mate, Mr. Binnacle, fire a cannon from his roof every 8 a.m. and 6 p.m.
 Ed Wynn as Uncle Albert, a jolly gentleman who suffers from an unknown condition where he floats in the air due to his uncontrollable laughter. Although he likes having company over, he becomes very sad and cries when his guests have to leave and he falls back to the ground, since it is the inversion of laughing.
 Reta Shaw as Mrs. Brill, the cook of the Banks residence.
 Don Barclay as Mr. Binnacle, Admiral Boom's first mate.
 Marjorie Bennett as Miss Lark, owner of the dog named Andrew, who frequently runs away.
 Arthur Malet as Mr. Dawes Jr., the director's son and member of the board.
 Jane Darwell as the "Bird Woman", an old woman who sells breadcrumbs for the pigeons on the steps of St Paul's Cathedral.
 Marjorie Eaton as Miss Persimmon
 James Logan as a doorman who chases after the children in the bank.
 Alma Lawton as Mrs. Corry, an old shopkeeper of a gingerbread shop and mother of two daughters.
 Betty Lou Gerson as Old Crone (uncredited)
 Kay E. Kuter as Man in Bank (uncredited)
 Doris Lloyd as Depositor (uncredited)
 Queenie Leonard as Depositor (uncredited)

Voice cast
 Julie Andrews as Robin, Female Pearly
 Marc Breaux as Cow
 Daws Butler as Penguin Waiter, Turtles
 Peter Ellenshaw as Penguin Waiter
 Paul Frees as Barnyard Horse
 Bill Lee as Ram
 Jimmy MacDonald as animals
 Sean McClory as Bloodhound, Reporter #4
 Dallas McKennon as Fox, Bloodhound, Penguin Waiter, Horse, Carousel Guard
 Alan Napier as Huntsman, Reporter #3, Bloodhound
 Marni Nixon as Geese
 J. Pat O'Malley as Bloodhound, Hunting Horse, Master of Hounds, Pearly Drummer, Penguin Waiter, photographer, Reporter #2
 George Pelling as Bloodhound, Reporter #1
 Thurl Ravenscroft as Hog
 Richard M. Sherman as Penguin Waiter, Male Pearly
 Robert B. Sherman as Pearly Banjo Player
 David Tomlinson as Penguin Waiter, Jockey, Race Track Stewards, Mary Poppins' Parrot Umbrella
 Ginny Tyler as the Lambs
 Martha Wentworth as Cockney Cow

Production

Development 

The first novel in the Mary Poppins series was the film's main basis. According to the 40th Anniversary DVD release of the film in 2004, Disney's daughters fell in love with the Mary Poppins books and made him promise to make a film based on them. Disney first attempted to purchase the film rights to Mary Poppins from P. L. Travers as early as 1938. However, Travers refused; she did not believe a film version of her books would do justice to her creation.

In addition, Disney was then known primarily as a producer of cartoons and had yet to produce any major live-action work. For more than 20 years, Disney periodically made efforts to convince Travers to allow him to make a Poppins film, which included making visits to Travers' home in Chelsea, London. He finally succeeded in 1961 although Travers demanded and obtained script approval rights. The Sherman Brothers composed the music score and were also involved in the film's development, suggesting the setting be changed from the 1930s to the Edwardian era. Pre-production and song composition took about two years.

Pre-production 
Travers was an adviser to the production, even being billed as the film's Consultant. However, she disapproved of the dilution of the harsher aspects of Mary Poppins' character, felt ambivalent about the music, and hated the use of animation so much that she ruled out any further adaptations of the later Mary Poppins novels. She objected to a number of elements that made it into the film. Rather than original songs, she wanted the soundtrack to feature known standards of the Edwardian period in which the story is set. However, due to contract stipulations citing that he had final cut privilege on the finished print, Disney overruled her.

Much of the Travers–Disney correspondence is part of the Travers collection of papers in the State Library of New South Wales, Australia. The relationship between Travers and Disney is detailed in Mary Poppins She Wrote, a biography of Travers by Valerie Lawson. The biography is the basis for two documentaries on Travers: The Real Mary Poppins and Lisa Matthews' The Shadow of Mary Poppins. Their relationship during the development of the film was also dramatized in the 2013 Disney film Saving Mr. Banks.

Casting 
In March 1961, Disney announced that it might cast Hayley Mills and Mary Martin in the film.

Julie Harris, Angela Lansbury and Bette Davis were considered for the role of Mary and Cary Grant was Walt's favorite choice for the role of Bert, Laurence Harvey and Anthony Newley were also considered for Bert.

Julie Andrews, who was making her feature film acting debut after a successful stage career, was given the prime role of Mary Poppins soon after she was passed over by Jack L. Warner and replaced with Audrey Hepburn for the role of Eliza Doolittle in his screen adaptation of My Fair Lady even though Andrews had originated that role on Broadway. When Disney first approached Andrews about taking on the role, Andrews was three months pregnant and therefore was not sure she should take it. Disney assured her that the crew would be fine with waiting to begin filming until after she had given birth so that she could play the part. Disney considered the actor Stanley Holloway for the role of Admiral Boom, during the pre-production stage, but the role went to Reginald Owen instead due to Holloway's commitment to My Fair Lady.

Andrews also provided the voice in two other sections of the film: during "A Spoonful of Sugar," she provided the whistling harmony for the robin, and she was also one of the Pearly singers during "Supercalifragilisticexpialidocious." David Tomlinson, besides playing Mr. Banks, provided the voice of Mary's talking umbrella and numerous other voice-over parts (including that of Admiral Boom's first mate). During the "Jolly Holiday" sequence, the three singing Cockney geese were all voiced by Marni Nixon, a regular aural substitute for actresses with substandard singing voices. Nixon later provided the singing voice for Hepburn in My Fair Lady and played one of Andrews' fellow nuns in The Sound of Music. Andrews later beat Hepburn for the Best Actress Award at the Golden Globes for their respective roles. Andrews also won the Oscar for Best Actress for her role. Hepburn did not receive a nomination. Richard Sherman, one of the songwriters, also voiced a penguin as well as one of the Pearlies. Robert Sherman dubbed the speaking voice for Jane Darwell because Darwell's voice was too weak to be heard in the soundtrack. Sherman's voice is heard saying the only line: "Feed the birds, tuppence a bag."

Disney cast Dick Van Dyke in the main supporting role of Bert after seeing his work on The Dick Van Dyke Show. After winning the role of Bert, Van Dyke lobbied to also play the senior Mr. Dawes, but Disney originally felt he was too young for the part. Van Dyke eventually won Disney over after a screen test. Although he is fondly remembered for this film, Van Dyke's attempt at a Cockney accent is regarded as one of the worst film accents in history, cited as an example by actors since as something that they wish to avoid. In a 2003 poll by Empire magazine of the worst film accents of all time, he came in second. Van Dyke claims that his accent coach was the English (of Irish extraction) J. Pat O'Malley, who "didn't do an accent any better than I did". In 2017, Van Dyke was selected to receive an award for television excellence from the British Academy of Film and Television Arts (BAFTA), at which time he said "I appreciate this opportunity to apologise to the members of BAFTA for inflicting on them the most atrocious cockney accent in the history of cinema." A chief executive of BAFTA responded, "We look forward to his acceptance speech in whatever accent he chooses on the night. We have no doubt it will be 'supercalifragilisticexpialidocious'."

Filming 
Filming took place between May and September 1963, and post-production and animation took another eleven months.

The scene in which Mary Poppins and Bert interact with a group of animated penguins is noted for its use of the sodium vapor process. Rather than using the more common bluescreen process to insert the actors into the animated footage, the actors were filmed against a white screen lit with sodium vapor lights, which have a yellow hue. A special camera was fitted with a prism that filtered this light to a separate reel of film, creating a highly accurate matte that could be used to isolate the actors from the background. This created a crisp, clean image and even allowed the partially transparent veil of Mary Poppins's costume to let through light from the background. The film was awarded the Academy Award for Best Visual Effects in 1965 for this effect.

Peter Menefee, one of the twelve dancing chimney sweeps supporting Bert, provided some insight into the choreography of the film:

The film's choreographers were Dee Dee Wood and her husband Marc Breaux. Walt Disney attended the rehearsals for the rooftop scenes every day.

Music 

The film's music features music and lyrics by Richard M. Sherman and Robert B. Sherman. The Shermans took inspiration from Edwardian British music hall music. Irwin Kostal arranged and conducted the film's score. Buena Vista Records released the original motion picture soundtrack in 1964 on LP and reel-to-reel tape.

Release
Mary Poppins premiered on August 27, 1964, at Grauman's Chinese Theatre in Los Angeles. The film's poster was painted by artist Paul Wenzel. Travers was not extended an invitation to the event, but managed to obtain one from a Disney executive. It was at the after-party that Richard Sherman recalled her walking up to Disney and loudly announcing that the animated sequence had to go. Disney responded, "Pamela, the ship has sailed" and walked away.

Home media
Mary Poppins was first released in late 1980 on VHS, Betamax, CED and LaserDisc. On October 4, 1988,  it was re-released as part of Walt Disney Home Video. On October 28, 1994, August 26, 1997, and March 31, 1998, it was re-released three times as part of the Walt Disney Masterpiece Collection. In 1998, this film became Disney's first feature film released on DVD. On July 4, 2000, it was released on VHS and DVD as part of the Gold Classic Collection. On December 14, 2004, it had a 2-disc DVD release in a Digitally Restored 40th Anniversary Edition as well as its final issue in the VHS format. The film's audio track featured an "Enhanced Home Theater Mix" consisting of replaced sound effects (to make the soundtrack more "modern") and improved fidelity and mixing and some enhanced music (this version was also shown on 2006–2012 ABC Family airings of the movie), though the DVD also included the original soundtrack as an audio option.

On January 27, 2009, the film was released on DVD again as a 45th anniversary edition, with more language tracks and special features (though the film's "Enhanced Home Theater Mix" was not included). Walt Disney Studios Home Entertainment released the film on Blu-ray as the 50th Anniversary Edition on December 10, 2013.

Critical reception
The film received universal acclaim from film critics. Whitney Williams of Variety praised the film's musical sequences and the performances of Julie Andrews and Dick Van Dyke, in particular. Time lauded the film, stating, "The sets are luxuriant, the songs lilting, the scenario witty but impeccably sentimental, and the supporting cast only a pinfeather short of perfection." Bosley Crowther, reviewing for The New York Times, described the film as a "most wonderful, cheering movie". Furthermore, in his review, he remarked that "For the visual and aural felicities they have added to this sparkling color film—the enchantments of a beautiful production, some deliciously animated sequences, some exciting and nimble dancing and a spinning musical score—make it the nicest entertainment that has opened at the Music Hall this year."

For The Hollywood Reporter, James Powers applauded the performances, visual effects, musical score, production design, and the choreography. Ultimately, he felt that "Mary Poppins is a picture that is, more than most, a triumph of many individual contributions. And its special triumph is that it seems to be the work of a single, cohesive intelligence." Ann Guerin of Life criticized the creative departures from the novels, particularly the "Jolly Holiday" sequence. She noted that "Some of the sequences have real charm, and perhaps the kids will eat them up. But speaking as a grownup, I found a little bit went a long way." She concluded that "With a little more restraint and a little less improvement on the original, the film's many charms would have been that much better."

The site's consensus reads, "A lavish modern fairy tale celebrated for its amazing special effects, catchy songs, and Julie Andrews's legendary performance in the title role." On Metacritic, the film has a weighted average score of 88 out of 100 based on 13 critics, indicating "universal acclaim". Critic Drew Casper summarized the impact of Mary Poppins in 2011:

Box office
The film earned $31 million in theatrical rentals in the United States and Canada during its initial run. It was one of the top 12 grossing films in the United States for 32 weeks. The film was re-released theatrically in 1973, in honor of Walt Disney Productions' 50th anniversary, and earned an estimated additional $9 million in rentals in the United States and Canada. It was released once more in 1980 and grossed $14 million. It returned a total lifetime rental of $45 million to Disney from a gross of over $102 million from its North American theatrical releases.

The film was the twentieth most popular sound film of the twentieth century in the UK with admissions of 14 million.

The film was very profitable for Disney. Made on an estimated budget of $4.4–6 million, it was reported by Cobbett Steinberg to be the most profitable film of 1965, earning a net profit of $28.5 million. Walt Disney used his huge profits from the film to purchase land in central Florida and finance the construction of Walt Disney World.

Accolades

Legacy 

Mary Poppins is widely considered Walt Disney's "crowning achievement". It was the only film of Disney's to garner a Best Picture nomination at the Oscars in his lifetime.

The newly constructed Walt Disney World Monorail System benefited from the film because of the profits the movie generated. Some profits from this movie were taken to help fund the Disney World Monorail system. Disney's monorail system pays homage to this film by naming the MAPO (MAry POppins) safety system included on all Disney monorails. Also, all Walt Disney World Railroad steam locomotives are fitted with a boiler safety device marked "MAPO."

Never at ease with the handling of her property by Disney or the way she felt she had been treated, Travers never agreed to another Poppins/Disney adaptation. So fervent was Travers' dislike of the Disney adaptation and of the way she felt she had been treated during the production that when producer Cameron Mackintosh approached her about the stage musical in the 1990s, she acquiesced on the conditions that he use only English-born writers and that no one from the film production be directly involved.

American Film Institute
 AFI's 100 Years ... 100 Songs:
 "Supercalifragilisticexpialidocious" – #36
 AFI's 100 Years of Musicals – #6

Sequel 

On December 19, 2018, Walt Disney Pictures released the film Mary Poppins Returns. The film takes place 25 years after the original, Mary Poppins, and features a standalone narrative based on the remaining seven books in the series. Rob Marshall directed, while John DeLuca and Marc Platt served as producers, with Emily Blunt starring as Poppins, co-starring Broadway actor Lin-Manuel Miranda.
Dick Van Dyke returned to portray Mr. Dawes Jr. Karen Dotrice also appeared in a cameo role.

In popular culture 
 The film inspired the eighth season episode of The Simpsons entitled "Simpsoncalifragilisticexpiala(Annoyed Grunt)cious", featuring a parody of Mary called "Shary Bobbins" who helps out the Simpson family after Marge loses her hair due to stress, and spoofs of the songs "The Perfect Nanny", "A Spoonful of Sugar", "Feed the Birds" and "The Life I Lead".
 In Season 3 Episode 4 of The Dick Van Dyke Show, Buddy Sorrell (Morey Amsterdam) is brainstorming about ideas for The Alan Brady Show and says, "how about if Alan comes out as a cockney chimney sweep but he is getting so fat he can't get down the chimney." Since the episode's air date (October 16, 1963) was after Mary Poppins finished filming (in September 1963) but before the film premiered (in 1964), this was both a wink to those behind the scenes who knew Mary Poppins was on the way and a nod to the character Dick Van Dyke plays in the movie.
 The penguin waiters and a silhouette of Mary Poppins appeared in Who Framed Roger Rabbit.

See also 
 List of American films of 1964

References

Bibliography
 
 
 
 
 
 
 Mayhall, Laura E Nym. "Domesticating Emmeline: Representing the Suffragette, 1930-1993." NWSA Journal 11, no. 2 (1999): 1-24.
 
 Pearce, Sharyn. "The Business of Myth-Making: Mary Poppins, P.L. Travers and the Disney Effect." Queensland Review 22, no. 01 (2015): 62–74.
 
 Stevenson, Ana. "'Cast Off the Shackles of Yesterday': Women's Suffrage in Walt Disney's Mary Poppins." Camera Obscura: Feminism, Culture, and Media Studies 98, no. 2 (2018): 69–103.
 Szumsky, Brian E. "'All That Is Solid Melts into the Air': The Winds of Change and Other Analogues of Colonialism in Disney's Mary Poppins." The Lion and the Unicorn 24, no. 1 (2000): 97–109.

External links 

 
 
 
 
 
 
 
 

Film
1964 films
American films with live action and animation
1960s English-language films
1964 children's films
1964 comedy films
1964 fantasy films
1964 musical films
American children's comedy films
American children's fantasy films
American children's musical films
American musical comedy films
American musical fantasy films
Films about dysfunctional families
Films adapted into plays
Films based on British novels
Films based on children's books
Films directed by Robert Stevenson
Films produced by Walt Disney
Films produced by Bill Walsh (producer)
Films featuring a Best Actress Academy Award-winning performance
Films featuring a Best Musical or Comedy Actress Golden Globe winning performance
Films set in 1910
Films set in London
Films set in England
Films that won the Best Original Score Academy Award
Films that won the Best Original Song Academy Award
Films that won the Best Visual Effects Academy Award
Films whose editor won the Best Film Editing Academy Award
Films about children
Films about magic
Musicals by the Sherman Brothers
Films about nannies
United States National Film Registry films
Walt Disney Pictures films
Films scored by Irwin Kostal
1960s children's animated films
1960s American films